Archery at the 2017 ASEAN Para Games was held at synthetic turf field at the National Sports Complex in Kuala Lumpur, Malaysia.

Events

Medal tally

Medalists

Recurve

Compound

See also
Archery at the 2017 Southeast Asian Games

External links
 Archery Games Result System  

2017 ASEAN Para Games
Archery at the ASEAN Para Games
ASEAN Para Games